Puya pearcei is a species of flowering plant in the Bromeliaceae family. It is endemic to Bolivia.

References

pearcei
Flora of Bolivia
Taxa named by Carl Christian Mez
Taxa named by John Gilbert Baker